Euwyn Poon is a Singapore-born entrepreneur who founded Spin, a shared electric scooter company based in San Francisco that was acquired by Ford in 2018, and is the founding partner of venture capital firm Moso Capital. Poon graduated from Cornell University in 2004 at the age of 18 with a degree in Computer Science and Cornell Law School in 2007. After earning a J.D. from Cornell Law School, he practiced M&A and securities law at Simpson Thacher & Bartlett from 2007 to 2009.

Early Startups
In 2010, Poon founded Opzi which later became the software platform behind the First Round Network.

Spin
In 2017, Poon and co-founders Derrick Ko and Zaizhuang Cheng started Spin, which became the first company to launch a shared micro-mobility solution in the United States when it launched orange-colored bicycles with GPS-enabled locks in Seattle in July. In early 2018, Spin introduced electric scooters to its fleet of shared vehicles, which resulted in rapid growth of the business until its acquisition by Ford in November. Spin operated as the micro-mobility unit of Ford as part of Ford Smart Mobility until March 2022, when it was acquired by Berlin's Tier Mobility, a leading shared mobility company.

References

1984 births
Living people
Canadian investors
Cornell Law School alumni
Cornell University alumni
Simpson Thacher & Bartlett